Carthage Central High School is located on a  site in a rural geographic area of northern New York State,  from the Canada–United States border,  south of Fort Drum,  east of Watertown, and  northeast of Syracuse. The high school serves the villages of Carthage, West Carthage, Black River, Great Bend, Felts Mills, Deferiet, Deer River, Herrings and Natural Bridge along with a portion of the housing at the Fort Drum Army base. The population within this area is approximately 22,000. It maintains a population of about 950 for grades 9–12.

Alumni
Casey Powell, professional lacrosse player
Ryan Powell, professional lacrosse player
Mikey Powell, professional lacrosse player
 Dave Trembley, Manager, Baltimore Orioles (2007-2010)
Mario Ventiquattro, professional lacrosse player
Khalid, Top charting singer-songwriter (did not graduate)

References

External links 

 New York State School Report Card Comprehensive Information Report (PDF)

Public high schools in New York (state)
Schools in Jefferson County, New York